Sea Lion Island is the largest of the Sea Lion Island Group of the Falkland Islands. It was designated a Ramsar site on 24 September 2001, and as an Important Bird Area (BirdLife International 2006). In 2017 the island was designated as a National Nature Reserve.

Description
East Loafers is the name of the bay on the southern shore. It also has a few ponds, including Beaver and Long Pond. Just to the south is Rum Island, a small seal colony. Other small members of the group are Brandy and Whisky Islands. The geology is mainly sandstone and mudstone, from about 250 million years ago. Some minor fossils have been found.

History
Sea Lion Island is the southernmost inhabited island of the Falkland Islands. Only formerly inhabited Beauchene Island is located further south. Sea Lion Island Settlement is the southernmost settlement of the Falkland Islands. The island has an airstrip. Historically, Sea Lion Island was a sheep farm. When the British ship Viscount was wrecked in 1892, the wreckage was used to build the farmhouse.

The island was managed as a sheep farm for almost all of the 20th century, but in 1997 all but a small flock of sheep was removed. In 1990, the Clifton family who owned the island, sold it to the Falkland Islands Development Corporation (FIDC). They had planted 60,000 stands of tussac grass.
Since then, ecotourism has been the only economic activity.  In 1986 FIDC constructed the Sea Lion Lodge, with accommodation for 20 guests. It was prefabricated and flown in kit form to the island by Royal Air Force helicopters and has proved to be a success. It is used by tourists and, since 1996, scientific researchers. Since 2017 the Lodge and island has been under the lease of Wild Falkland Ltd.

There is a memorial to HMS Sheffield on Bull Hill in the south of the island.

Flora and fauna
Some 56 species of flowering plants have been recorded, including the Fuegian violet which, in the Falklands, is found nowhere else.  The island is known for its marine mammals, including breeding colonies of southern sea lions and southern elephant seals, for which the other islands in the group are haul-out sites. Killer whales are seen offshore. Elephant Seal Research Group (ESRG) has been tracking the habits of elephant seals at Sea Lion Island for over 20 years.

Birds
The Sea Lion Islands Group has been identified by BirdLife International as an Important Bird Area.  It is a significant breeding site for a variety of seabirds and other waterbirds including Falkland steamer ducks, ruddy-headed geese, gentoo penguins (2800 pairs), southern rockhopper penguins (480 pairs), Magellanic penguins, southern giant-petrels (25 pairs) and sooty shearwaters.  It also supports populations of striated caracaras (10 pairs), blackish cinclodes, Cobb's wrens and white-bridled finches.

References

 Stonehouse, B (ed.) Encyclopedia of Antarctica and the Southern Oceans (2002)

External links

 Sealionisland.com
 Falkland Islands, including Sea Lion island section
 Pictures from Sea Lion Island
 Long term study of Sea Lion Island elephant seals
 Wildlife images from Sealion Island

Islands of the Falkland Islands
Ramsar sites in British Overseas Territories
Important Bird Areas of the Falkland Islands
Seabird colonies